Jean-Louis Laya (4 December 1761, Paris – 25 August 1833, Meudon) was a French playwright. He wrote his first comedy in collaboration with Gabriel-Marie Legouvé in 1785. The piece, however, though accepted by the Comédie française, was never represented. In 1789 he produced a plea for religious toleration in the form of a five-act tragedy in verse, Jean Calas. In his next work, the injustice of the disgrace cast on a family by the crime of one of its members formed the theme of Les Dangers de l'opinion (1790).

It is by his Ami des lois (1793) that Laya is best remembered. This energetic protest against mob rule, with its scarcely veiled characterizations of Robespierre as Nomophage and of Marat as Duricrne, was an act of the highest courage, for the play was produced at the Théâtre Français (temporarily Théâtre de la Nation) only nineteen days before the execution of Louis XVI.

Ten days after its first production the piece was prohibited by the Commune, but the public demanded its representation; the mayor of Paris was compelled to appeal to the National Convention, and the piece was played while some 30,000 Parisians guarded the hall. Laya went into hiding, and several persons convicted of having a copy of the obnoxious play in their possession were guillotined.

At the end of the Terror Laya returned to Paris. In 1813 he replaced Delille in the Paris chair of literary history and French poetry; he was admitted to the Académie française in 1817. Laya produced in 1797 Les Deux Stuarts, and in 1799 Falkland, the title-role of which provided Talma with one of his finest opportunities. Laya's works, which chiefly owe their interest to the circumstances attending their production, were collected in 1836-1837.  His son, Léon, was also a playwright.

Works

Theatre 
1790: Les Dangers de l'opinion, drama in 5 acts, in verse, Théâtre de la Nation, 19 January
1790: Jean Calas, tragedy in 5 acts and in verse, Paris, Théâtre de la Nation, 18 December
1793: L'Ami des lois, comedy in 5 acts in verse, Paris, Théâtre de la Nation, 2 January.read online on Gallica
1798: Falkland, ou La conscience, drama in five acts in prose, Paris, Théâtre-Français, 25 May
1799: Une Journée du jeune Néron, comedy burlesque in 2 acts and in verse, Paris, Théâtre de l'Odéon, 15 February

Trivia 
1789: Voltaire aux Français, sur leur constitution (1789)
1789: La Régénération des comédiens en France, ou leurs droits à l'état civil (1789)
1793: Almanach sur l'état des comédiens en France, ou leurs droits défendus comme citoyens, par l'auteur de « L'Ami des lois » 
1836: Œuvres complètes. Études sur l'histoire littéraire de l'antiquité grecque et latine, et sur les premiers siècles de la littérature française

References
 
 Notice biographique sur J. L. Laya (1833)
 Charles Nodier, Discours de reception, (December 26, 1833)
 Welschinger, Théâtre de la revolution (1880).

External links 
 Jean-Louis Laya on data.bnf.fr

1761 births
1833 deaths
Writers from Paris
Members of the Académie Française
Burials at Père Lachaise Cemetery
18th-century French dramatists and playwrights
19th-century French dramatists and playwrights